Julio Manuel Segundo Ríos (born 26 September 1993) is a Panamian footballer, who plays for San Francisco in Liga Panameña de Fútbol as a midfielder.

Club career
He began his career in the quarry of San Francisco . With this club he made his professional debut in 2009 against Chorrillo . That same year he was elected by the Manchester City to train 10 days with the English club. In August 2010 he signed for Sport Boys in the First Division of Peru, but two days after the player had to return home as he did not meet the standards of FIFA for being a minor.

In 2012, he signed for Skonto Riga in the Virsliga. On 25 March 2012 he debuted with Skonto. During his time in Skonto he achieved to perform in twenty four games, score one goal and also play during two UEFA Europa League matches against HNK Hajduk Split, where Skonto were eliminated as they were defeated by 1-2 on aggregate.

In July 2013, the Superleague Greece side Veria signed Segundo on a free transfer for 3 years. In June 2014 he joined San Francisco on loan after another loan spell at Independiente.

Segundo mutually terminated his contract with Veria on 28 August 2015.

Honours

Skonto F.C.
 Virsliga Runner-up
 2012
 Latvian Cup winner
 2012
 Latvian Super Cup Runner-up
 2013
 UEFA Europa League games
2012 x2
 Copa Libertadores
2010 x2

References

External links

1993 births
Living people
People from La Chorrera District
Association football midfielders
Panamanian footballers
San Francisco F.C. players
Skonto FC players
Veria F.C. players
Panamanian expatriate footballers
Expatriate footballers in Latvia
Super League Greece players
Panama under-20 international footballers
Panama youth international footballers